Le Fou or Lefou may refer to:

Judex Lefou (b. 1966), a Mauritian  hurdler 
Le Fou (Disney), a character in Disney's Beauty and the Beast

See also
Le Fou d'Elsa, a 1963 novel written by Louis Aragon
Pierrot le Fou, a 1965 film directed by Jean-Luc Godard